The Mad Optimist is an American manufacturer of organic soaps and personal care products. The company allows customers to choose ingredients going into their products as well as the product's price.

The company was originally founded in Bloomington, Indiana in 2012 under the name Soapy Soap Company. by two brothers, Mohammed M. and Mohammed A. Mahdi, and Anthony Duncan.

The company claims their products does not contain synthetic fragrance, dyes, artificial preservatives, parabens, or phthalates. They are ought to be vegan, halal, cruelty-free, and gluten-free.

History 

In April of 2012, The Mad Optimist created the brand Sabun

In mid 2016, the company created the brand DesignMySoap.com which offered customized personal care products.

The company was part of the 2017 cohort of Cincinnati, OH based startup accelerator, The Brandery.

In 2018 the company partnered with global brand design agency LPK who helped it rebrand as The Mad Optimist.

The company gained notoriety when it was featured on May 15, 2020 on ABC's Shark Tank, Season 11 Finale Episode 24. Shark and billionaire entrepreneur Mark Cuban offered to invest $60,000 for 20% equity stake in their business.

Awards 
 Transform Awards North America 2019-Best visual identity from the FMCG sector: Silver - The Mad Optimist
 Indiana Small Business Development Center (ISBDC): 2014 EDGE Award Winner for the category of Established Business. Awarded June 19, 2015.

References 

Companies based in Bloomington, Indiana
Companies established in 2012
Manufacturing companies based in Indiana
Social enterprises